The Mid–Florida Conference is a conference within the National Junior College Athletic Association (NJCAA) Region 8. The conference consists of seven state colleges located in Florida.

Members
Member institutions are:
Seminole State College of Florida
St. Johns River State College
College of Central Florida
Daytona State College
Florida State College at Jacksonville
Lake-Sumter State College
Santa Fe College

See also
National Junior College Athletic Association (NJCAA)
Florida State College Activities Association (FCSAA - the governing body of NJCAA Region 8)
Panhandle Conference, also in Region 8
Southern Conference, also in Region 8
Suncoast Conference, also in Region 8

References

External links
FSCAA/NJCAA Region 8 website
NJCAA Website

NJCAA conferences
College sports in Florida